The Chambers Building in Kansas City, Missouri was built in 1915 and 1923.  It was designed in Early Commercial style by architect Charles A. Smith.  Smith, Rae and Lovitt is also associated with the building.

It has been marketed as Chambers Lofts.  A renovation received low-income housing tax credits.

The building was listed on the U.S. National Register of Historic Places in 2001.

It is a 12-story building built of structural steel with a brick and terra cotta exterior.  It was built in two phases: 1915 construction of first five stories, and 1923 addition of top seven stories.

References

Buildings and structures in Kansas City, Missouri
Commercial buildings on the National Register of Historic Places in Missouri
National Register of Historic Places in Kansas City, Missouri